The William Ogilvie House is a property in College Grove, Tennessee, United States dating from c. 1800 that was listed on the National Register of Historic Places in 1988. It includes Log pen and other architecture.

This house is one of five log buildings built during 1798 to 1800, during the earliest settling of the area, which survive to today.  Others, also NRHP-listed, are: the David McEwen House, the Andrew Crockett House, the Daniel McMahan House, and the William Boyd House.

References

Houses in Williamson County, Tennessee
Houses on the National Register of Historic Places in Tennessee
Houses completed in 1800
National Register of Historic Places in Williamson County, Tennessee